Aponia itzalis is a moth in the family Crambidae. It was described by Eugene G. Munroe in 1964. It is found in Yucatán, Mexico.

References

Moths described in 1964
Pyraustinae
Moths of Central America